Ponerorchis compacta is a species of flowering plant in the family Orchidaceae, native to south-central China (west Sichuan).

Taxonomy
The species was first described in 1924 by Rudolf Schlechter, as Neottianthe compacta. A molecular phylogenetic study in 2014 found that species of Neottianthe, Amitostigma and Ponerorchis were mixed together in a single clade, making none of the three genera monophyletic as then circumscribed. Neottianthe and Amitostigma were subsumed into Ponerorchis, with this species becoming Ponerorchis compacta.

References

compacta
Orchids of Sichuan
Plants described in 1924